The French submarine Y was a single-hull experimental submarine designed by Louis-Émile Bertin for the French Navy. She was launched in July 1905 but was never commissioned and remained in experimental status. A planned refit, which included adding an electric motor for underwater propulsion in 1907 was cancelled. Y was disarmed and stricken on 1 March 1909.

Design
The submarine was powered by a  diesel engine for both surface and submerged running. She had a complement of 15 men.

Her armament comprised two  bow torpedo tubes, two  Drzewiecki drop collar torpedo launchers and one external cradle aft .

Construction and career
Y was laid down in the Arsenal de Toulon, launched on 24 July 1905 and completed in 1906. Y was a single-hull diesel design by Louis-Émile Bertin. Y received the pennant number Q 37 and cost F924,300.

Y was used for trials and experiments and never commissioned into the French Marine Nationale. In 1907, a reconstruction was proposed to install an electric motor and batteries for submerged running, but eventually the idea was abandoned. Y was disarmed and stricken in May 1909.

See also 

List of submarines of France

Notes

References

Citations

Biography

 
 

1904 ships
Experimental submarines
Submarines of France